There are at least 4 named lakes and reservoirs in Treasure County, Montana.

Lakes

Reservoirs
 Haines Reservoir, el. 
 Horton Reservoir, el. 
 Larsens Reservoir, el. 
 Teds Reservoir, el.

See also
 List of lakes in Montana

Notes

Bodies of water of Treasure County, Montana
Treasure